The Global Scenario Group (GSG) was an international, interdisciplinary body convened in 1995 by the Tellus Institute and the Stockholm Environment Institute (SEI) to develop scenarios for world development in the twenty-first century. Further development of the Great Transition scenarios has been carried on by the Great Transition Initiative (GTI).

The GSG's underlying scenario development work was rooted in the long-range integrated scenario analysis that Tellus Institute and Stockholm Environment Institute had undertaken through the PoleStar Project and its PoleStar System.  Initially conceived in 1991 as a tool for integrated sustainability planning and long-range scenario analysis, the PoleStar System was inspired by the 1987 Brundtland Commission report Our Common Future, which first put the concept of sustainable development on the international agenda.

The work of the Global Scenario Group was widely adopted in high-level intergovernmental settings.  The scenarios informed numerous international assessments, including the World Water Council's World Water Vision report in 1999–2000, the OECD Environmental Outlook in 2001, the Intergovernmental Panel on Climate Change's greenhouse gas emission mitigation assessment in 2001, the United Nations Environment Programme's Third GEO Report in 2002, and the Millennium Ecosystem Assessment in 2005.

Several of the GSG participants who actively participated in the IPCC assessments have been recognized for contributing to the 2007 award of the Nobel Peace Prize to the IPCC.

Scenarios
In 2002, the GSG formally summarized their scenario approach in an essay called Great Transition: The Promise and Lure of the Times Ahead. The essay argues that history has entered a qualitatively new era of high global interdependence, which they refer to as the planetary phase of civilization. Some kind of global society will take shape in this century, but its form remains deeply uncertain and highly contested. Three classes of scenarios are discussed – Conventional Worlds, Barbarization, and Great Transitions.

Conventional Worlds

Conventional Worlds scenarios envision a future which unfolds without major surprises and with essential continuity with current trends, driving forces, and dominant values.  Market Forces versions rely heavily on free markets that generate sufficient and timely technological evolution to address emerging environmental and social challenges. Policy Reform versions assume instead that governments mobilize to mount a coordinated, sustained, and effective regime of policy adjustments to mitigate environmental disasters and social destabilization.

Barbarization

Barbarization scenarios depict futures in which the market and policy adjustments of Conventional Worlds are inadequate to address such problems as climate change and social polarization, leading to a devolution of civilized norms. In Fortress World variants, powerful global actors respond to impending collapse by mounting an authoritarian intervention to stem environmental degradation and social conflict. International elites retreat to protected enclaves, where they manage remaining natural resources and protect their interests. Outside these enclaves, the remainder of civilization endures poverty and degradation. Breakdown variants would ensue if the elite are unable to form a coherent, adequate response to the mounting crisis. The world descends into conflict and degradation, as institutions collapse.

The Great Transition

Great Transition scenarios go beyond the market and policy adjustments of Conventional Worlds to envision a fundamental shift in institutions and values. The growth imperative of Conventional Worlds economies give way to steady state economies, the tendency toward inequality is countered by egalitarian social policies, and human values turn toward solidarity, well-being, and ecology, rather than individualism, consumerism, and domination of nature. The potential of a Great Transition is linked to the emergence of a global citizens movement to advocate for new values to underpin global society.

Eco-communalism variants are characterized by extreme localism, while the New Sustainability Paradigm alternative welcomes cosmopolitanism and global governance in a plural world.  In all versions, civilization has a far smaller ecological footprint, societies are more equitable, and citizens have more leisure time to pursue fulfilling activities.

See also
Globalization
Post-capitalism
Transition scenario
Tellus Institute
Stockholm Environment Institute
Scenario analysis
Great Transition

References

External links
 Global Scenario Group – An international initiative to examine alternative futures

International environmental organizations
Futures studies organizations